North East Harbour is a community in Nova Scotia, Canada, located in the Shelburne municipal district of Shelburne County.

See also
 List of communities in Nova Scotia

References

External links
North East Harbour on Destination Nova Scotia

Communities in Shelburne County, Nova Scotia
General Service Areas in Nova Scotia
Populated coastal places in Canada